Aníbal Acevedo may refer to:

Aníbal Acevedo Vilá (born 1962),  eighth governor of the Commonwealth of Puerto Rico
Aníbal Santiago Acevedo (born 1971), Puerto Rican boxer

See also
Acevedo (disambiguation)